82nd NBR Awards
Best Film:
The Social Network

The 82nd National Board of Review Awards honored the best in film for 2010.

Top 10 Films
Films listed alphabetically except top, which is ranked as Best Film of the Year:

The Social Network
Another Year
The Fighter
Hereafter
Inception
The King's Speech
Shutter Island
The Town
Toy Story 3
True Grit
Winter's Bone

Top Foreign Films 
I Am Love
Incendies
Life, Above All
Soul Kitchen
White Material

Top Documentaries 
A Film Unfinished
Inside Job
Joan Rivers: A Piece of Work
Restrepo
The Tillman Story

Top Independent Films 
Animal Kingdom
Buried
Fish Tank
The Ghost Writer
Greenberg
Let Me In
Monsters
Please Give
Somewhere
Youth in Revolt

Winners

Best Film:
The Social Network
Best Director:
David Fincher, The Social Network
Best Actor:
Jesse Eisenberg, The Social Network
Best Actress:
Lesley Manville, Another Year
Best Supporting Actor:
Christian Bale, The Fighter
Best Supporting Actress:
Jacki Weaver, Animal Kingdom
Best Foreign Film:
Of Gods and Men
Best Documentary:
Waiting For “Superman”
Best Animated Feature:
Toy Story 3
Best Ensemble Cast:
The Town
Breakthrough Performance:
Jennifer Lawrence, Winter's Bone
Spotlight Award for Best Directorial Debut:
Sebastian Junger and Tim Hetherington, Restrepo
Best Original Screenplay:
Chris Sparling, Buried
Best Adapted Screenplay:
Aaron Sorkin, The Social Network
Special Filmmaking Achievement Award:
Sofia Coppola, for writing, directing, and producing Somewhere
William K. Everson Film History Award:
Leonard Maltin
NBR Freedom of Expression:
Fair Game
Conviction
Howl

External links

2010
2010 film awards
2010 in American cinema